The Ritz-Carlton Hotel was a luxury hotel in New York City, owned by the Ritz-Carlton Hotel Company. It was located at 46th Street and Madison Avenue in Midtown Manhattan.

History
The Ritz-Carlton Investing Company was established by Albert Keller, who bought and franchised the name in the United States. The New York hotel opened in 1911; it was the first Ritz-Carlton Hotel in the U.S. Louis Diat ran the kitchens and is believed to have invented the modern vichyssoise there. Vincent Sardi Jr. completed his training at the hotel before rejoining Sardi's, his family restaurant business.

In the opening year, the Ritz-Carlton Company announced its intention to expand the hotel, adding 100 rooms, a 300-seat banquet hall, ballroom, and private dining rooms, all on the 46th Street side.  Upon the death of the hotel's owner, Robert Walton Goelet, in 1941, he bequeathed the hotel, "free and clear of mortgage and restrictions" to his alma mater, Harvard University.

The New York hotel was demolished in 1951, leaving only the Boston location.

Later operations
In 1982, Blakely licensed the Ritz-Carlton name to hotelier John Bennett Coleman for two hotels Coleman was renovating, The Fairfax in Washington, D.C., and the Navarro at 112 (now 110) Central Park South in New York City. Coleman renamed them the Ritz-Carlton Washington D.C. and the Ritz-Carlton New York in April 1982. The two hotels eventually joined the modern chain that would be founded a few years later. Ritz-Carlton's management of the New York hotel ended in 1997, with the hotel joining the Sheraton chain and becoming a Westin, and later an InterContinental. The building was converted to a luxury co-op in 2006.

In 1999 Ritz-Carlton acquired the former Hotel St. Moritz in New York City. It was extensively renovated and re-opened in 2002 as a luxury hotel and condominium complex called the Ritz-Carlton New York, Central Park.

References

1911 establishments in New York City
1951 disestablishments in New York (state)
Buildings and structures demolished in 1951
Defunct hotels in Manhattan
Demolished buildings and structures in Manhattan
Demolished hotels in New York City
Hotel buildings completed in 1911
Hotels established in 1911
Madison Avenue
Midtown Manhattan
New York City